10, 9, 8, 7, 6, 5, 4, 3, 2, 1 is the fourth studio album by Midnight Oil that was released on vinyl in 1982 under the Columbia Records label. It peaked at No. 3 on the Australian Kent Music Report Albums Chart and remained on the chart for 171 weeks. It also became the band's first album to be released in the US, where it peaked at number 178 on the Billboard 200.

At the 1982 Countdown Music Awards, the album was nominated for Best Australian Album.

In October 2010, the album was listed in the top 30 in the book 100 Best Australian Albums, with 1987's Diesel and Dust at No. 1. In July 2011, the album was listed in Triple J Hottest 100 Australian Albums of All Time, 2011 at number 21. In December 2021, the album was listed at no. 19 in Rolling Stone Australia’s ‘200 Greatest Albums of All Time’ countdown.

Content
The album's closing track "Somebody's Trying to Tell Me Something" contains a note held by the group which would continue into the album's runout groove, and emulated on the CD version for just over 40 seconds. This is an approximation of a locked groove, a method used a number of times on vinyl albums (such as Diamond Dogs and Sgt. Pepper's Lonely Hearts Club Band) where the ending sound would continue into the runout groove, thus continuing indefinitely until the turntable arm was lifted off or the automatic return, present on some turntables, kicked in.

Garrett noted, "We wanted, as a band, to make this album lyrically stronger, because these are fucking desperate times. It's very important for us to get immediate, because we can't go on making records like this for years and years and people can't go on ignoring it."

Reception

Mark Deming at AllMusic wrote: "It's remarkably listenable and catchy, offering up one passionate anthem after another. The band's politics are both well considered and unapologetically upfront throughout... 10, 9, 8, 7, 6, 5, 4, 3, 2, 1 was [Midnight Oil's] first undeniably great album and still ranks with their very best."

David Fricke said the album, "sounds like the end of the world turned up to 10".

Track listing

Charts

Weekly charts

Year-end charts

Certifications

Personnel
Midnight Oil
 Peter Garrett – lead vocals
 Peter Gifford – bass, vocals
 Rob Hirst – drums, vocals
 Jim Moginie – guitars, keyboards
 Martin Rotsey – guitars

Additional personnel
 Gary Barnacle, Peter Thoms & Luke Tunney – brass (on "Power and the Passion")

References

Midnight Oil albums
Sprint Music albums
1982 albums
Albums produced by Nick Launay
Columbia Records albums